Game of Death is an incomplete Hong Kong film directed, written, produced and starring Bruce Lee, who died during its production.

Game of Death can also refer to:

 A Game of Death, a 1945 adventure film
 Game of Death II, a 1981 sequel to the Bruce Lee film using recycled footage from other Bruce Lee films
 Game of Death (2010 film), a direct-to-DVD action film starring Wesley Snipes
 13 Beloved, a 2006 Thai film also known as 13: Game of Death

See also
 Le Jeu de la Mort (English: The Game of Death), a 2009 French documentary